The Bördekreis was a district (Kreis) in Saxony-Anhalt, Germany. Neighboring districts are (from north clockwise) Ohrekreis, district-free Magdeburg, Schönebeck,  Aschersleben-Staßfurt, Quedlinburg, Halberstadt and the district Helmstedt in Lower Saxony.

History 
The district was created in 1994 when the two districts Oschersleben and Wanzleben were merged. Both precursor districts were created in 1816 under the Prussian government, and only underwent small changes in the time until their inclusion into the new district.

Geography 
The district got its name from the landscape it is located in, the Magdeburger Börde. Due to the fertile loess soil it was for long an agricultural area.

The highest elevation is the Heidberg (211 m) east of Sommersdorf. There are several small rivers in the district, the most known one is the Aller.

Coat of arms

Towns and municipalities

External links 
Official website of the new district Börde (German)

eo:Distrikto Börde